The Stockport and Woodley Junction Railway was incorporated on 15 May 1860 to build a  railway from Stockport Portwood to a junction with the Manchester, Sheffield and Lincolnshire Railway's (MS&LR) authorised Newton and Compstall line at Woodley.

History
The 1860 Act was promoted by landowners and supported by the Manchester, Sheffield and Lincolnshire Railway (MS&LR) who, along with the Great Northern Railway (GNR) were allowed to subscribe.

Together the MSLR and GNR formed a joint committee to operate this railway along with three others that had been authorised but were not yet open.  Together these railways connected up to provide an alternative route into North Cheshire that avoided Manchester. 

Each company was to provide an equal amount of capital and four representatives to the joint management committee. This arrangement was confirmed by the Great Northern (Cheshire Lines) Act in Parliament in 1863. This Act had not, however, formally set up a separate legal body, providing instead for the two companies to manage and work the four railways through their existing structures.

This arrangement eventually led to the formation of the Cheshire Lines Committee in 1865. The line was then formally brought under the direct joint ownership of the MS&LR and GNR in 1865 by the Cheshire Lines Transfer Act, 1865. The Act allowed the Midland Railway (MR) to join as an equal partner, which it did in 1866. and finally The Cheshire Lines Committee was authorised by The Cheshire Lines Act, 1867 as a fully independent organisation with a board formed from three directors from each of the parent companies.

Opening
The Stockport and Woodley Junction Railway opened for passenger traffic on 12 January 1863 and for goods traffic in 1865.

Route and stations
There were no other stations. At the other end the line terminated at Woodley Junction,  short of MS&LR's  station.

References

Notes

Citations

Bibliography

External links
 Stockport and Woodley Junction Railway Company Records - The National Archives

Cheshire Lines Committee Lines